Ignas Barkauskas (born 6 November 1988) is a Lithuanian diver.

Achievements

References 
EC2008
EC2011

1988 births
Living people
Lithuanian male divers
Sportspeople from Vilnius